Daisy Lake is a lake in the city of Greater Sudbury in northeastern Ontario, Canada. It is in the Lake Huron drainage basin and is the source of the Whitefish River.

There is one unnamed creek inflow, and the primary outflow is the Whitefish River which flows to the North Channel on Lake Huron.

The lake is also home to the new Daisy Lake Uplands Provincial Park.

See also
List of lakes in Ontario

References

Lakes of Greater Sudbury